Dawson Independent School District is a public school district based in the community of Welch, Texas (USA).

In addition to Dawson County, it includes sections in Lynn County and Terry County.

In 2009, the school district was rated "academically acceptable" by the Texas Education Agency.

School
The school of Dawson ISD is home to a mere 149 students. Dawson is home to the Dawson Dragons. Most of the school is focused on meeting academic standards while some are more focused on athletics.

Special programs

Athletics
Dawson High School plays six-man football.

See also

List of school districts in Texas

References

External links

School districts in Dawson County, Texas
School districts in Terry County, Texas
School districts in Lynn County, Texas